Celestina may refer to:

In arts and entertainment:
La Celestina, a 15th-century Spanish novel
Celestina (novel), an 18th-century English work by poet Charlotte Turner Smith
La Celestina, Spanish title of The Wanton of Spain, a 1969 Spanish drama film
Celestina, a harpsichord-like keyboard instrument whose strings were sounded with a bow, invented by Adam Walker (inventor)

People:
Celestina Aladekoba, American dancer and choreographer
Celestina Boninsegna (1877–1947), Italian operatic soprano
Celestina Popa (born 1970), Romanian retired artistic gymnast

 Celestina May - Vintage Hair stylist, redhead, philanthropist, musical muse.

See also
Celestine (disambiguation)